The State Register of Heritage Places is maintained by the Heritage Council of Western Australia. , 471 places are heritage-listed in the City of Albany, of which 95 are on the State Register of Heritage Places.

List
The Western Australian State Register of Heritage Places, lists the following 95 state registered places within the City of Albany:

Notes

 No coordinates specified by Inherit database

References

Albany
 
Albany